Ward is an unincorporated community in Jackson Township, Boone County, in the U.S. state of Indiana.

History
Ward was laid out in 1883 by Thomas Ward, and named for him. A post office was established at Ward in 1884, and remained in operation until 1900.

Geography

References

Unincorporated communities in Boone County, Indiana
Unincorporated communities in Indiana
Indianapolis metropolitan area